The 1993–94 Challenge Cup was the 93rd staging of rugby league's oldest knockout competition, the Challenge Cup. Known as the Silk Cut Challenge Cup for sponsorship reasons, the final was contested by Wigan and Leeds at Wembley. Wigan won the match 26–16.

First round

Second round

Third round

Fourth round

Fifth round

Quarter-finals

Semi finals

Final

References

External links
Challenge Cup official website 
Challenge Cup 1993/94 results at Rugby League Project

Challenge Cup
Challenge Cup
Challenge Cup